
The Eichberg Tower is an observation tower on the  369 m high Eichberg mountain above the city of Emmendingen.  The tower platform sits 10 m above the surrounding oak forest, and its top over 17 mm making it the highest observation tower in the state of Baden-Württemberg.

The tower, created by an association of citizens formed in 1999, was handed over to the city of Emmendingen on September 17, 2005 and is now open to the public.

Construction
The platform is made of oak and sits on six Douglas fir trunks which, together with an upper platform framework, form a pyramid shape. The stairway is cylindrical, made from sectional steel and structural steel fabric, with 240 oak steps.

See also
List of towers

External links
Official site 
 

.

Buildings and structures in Baden-Württemberg
Observation towers in Baden-Württemberg